Motsapi Moorosi (4 May 1945 – 8 February 2013) was a Lesotho sprinter. He competed in the men's 100 metres at the 1972 Summer Olympics. He also competed in the men's 200 metres at the 1972 Summer Olympics where he qualified to the quarterfinals. He coached the Lesotho team at the 1980 Summer Olympics in Moscow.

References

1945 births
2013 deaths
Athletes (track and field) at the 1972 Summer Olympics
Lesotho male sprinters
Olympic athletes of Lesotho
Athletes (track and field) at the 1974 British Commonwealth Games
Commonwealth Games competitors for Lesotho
People from Maseru